Bloomingdale's Inc. is an American luxury department store chain; it was founded in New York City by Joseph B. and Lyman G. Bloomingdale in 1861. A third brother, Emanuel Watson Bloomingdale, was also involved in the business. It became a division of the Cincinnati-based Federated Department Stores in 1930 under then-president Samuel Bloomingdale. 

In 1994, the Macy's department store chain joined the Federated Department Stores holding company. In 2007, Federated Department Stores was renamed Macy's, Inc. As of October 29, 2022, there are 54 stores (56 boxes) including 32 department stores (34 boxes, all full line), 1 Bloomies, 1 furniture/other store and 20 outlet stores (There are a total of 35 stores) with the Bloomingdale's nameplate in operation throughout the United States. Its headquarters and flagship store are located at 59th Street and Lexington Avenue in the New York City borough of Manhattan.

History

1980s–1990s
The retail market boomed in the 1980s. New stores opened along the East Coast, Florida, Chicago, and in Dallas, Texas. In 1996, Bloomingdale's expanded to the west coast with the acquisition of some former leases of The Broadway (Southern California) and Emporium stores (Bay Area) which closed early that year due to Macy's and Bullock's (owned by Macy's) already existing in the malls since Federated Stores acquired Broadway Stores Inc in 1995.

Current operations under Macy's, Inc.

2007–2009
In 2007, Bloomingdale’s expanded into San Diego (Fashion Valley) and Costa Mesa (South Coast Plaza) by acquiring leases of former Robinsons-May stores which closed in 2006 due to Macy's already existing in the malls since Federated Stores acquired the May Department Stores Company in 2005.
On February 14, 2008, parent company, Macy's, Inc., announced plans to enter the Phoenix market with a 180,000 square foot store by 2009. Arizona would have been the thirteenth state to have a Bloomingdale's store location, with this store being the tenth in the western U.S. and 41st throughout the chain. This store never materialized as a result of the Great Recession in 2009.

On September 10, 2008, Bloomingdale's announced plans to open three stores, two of which will be modeled after the SoHo store: a 3-level,  anchor store at The Shops at Georgetown Park in Washington, D.C., by August 2011, a 3-level  store at Westfield Valley Fair in San Jose, California, by Fall 2011, and a  store in Santa Monica Place, in Santa Monica, CA (which opened on August 6, 2010).  The store is reported to be modeled after the chain's concept store in New York's SoHo neighborhood to carry select contemporary men's and women's apparel.

Twelve days later, the first proposed overseas locations for the chain were announced. A September 22, 2008, press release from Macy's Inc. told of plans for two Bloomingdale's locations (a three-level  apparel and accessories store, as well as a separate one level  home store to open in February 2010 in Dubai, United Arab Emirates. As is the case for rival Saks Fifth Avenue, the international presence for Bloomingdale's will be operated under license by a local interest – in this case, Al Tayer Group LLC, a leading UAE-based conglomerate. Bloomingdale's CEO announced that the Dubai store will most likely be the only store outside of the US since Bloomingdale's has no further plans to expand to other countries.

2010–2019

On November 3, 2011, Bloomingdale's announced it opened a new  store in Glendale Galleria in late 2013 as part of the mall's remodeling plan, replacing the mall's former Mervyn's store.

On January 4, 2012, Bloomingdale's announced it would close four stores. The most significant closure was at the Mall of America in Bloomington, Minnesota, where Bloomingdale's was one of the mall's first anchors. Additionally, a home store at Oakbrook Center in Oak Brook, Illinois, and full line stores in Perimeter Mall in Dunwoody, Georgia, and (former) White Flint Mall in North Bethesda, Maryland, have closed.

On January 3, 2013, Bloomingdale's announced that they would close the Las Vegas Home store at Fashion Show Mall.

The store opened in 2014.

On November 12, 2015, Bloomingdale's opened up their first store in Hawaii at Ala Moana Center in Honolulu, Hawaii. The three-story,  store replaced a former Sears store, and includes special services such as smart fitting rooms, charging lounges, and dining services at its 40 Carrots restaurant.

In late 2019, Bloomingdale's, along with Macy’s, announced that fur will no longer be sold in any of its stores, including The Outlet, as of the end of the 2020 fiscal year.

2020s
On February 7, 2020, Macy’s, Inc. announced that they will permanently close one full-line Bloomingdale’s location at The Falls Mall, which is located in South Miami, Florida and was the mall’s first anchor. It was also the oldest Bloomingdale’s department store in Florida.

In March 2020, Macy's, Inc. announced that it would temporarily close all Bloomingdale's and Macy's locations until March 31 to help reduce the spread of COVID-19. Its stores remained closed during April when the company announced that locations with less restrictive or relaxed coronavirus measures would reopen in early May. The company expected all its stores to be open over the following six weeks.

On January 7, 2021, it was announced that the location in Santa Monica, CA would be permanently closing. It was one of three anchors at Santa Monica Place, the other being Nordstrom.

Gallery

References

External links

Bloomingdale's Main Website

Commercial buildings in Manhattan
Clothing retailers of the United States
Companies based in New York City
Retail companies established in 1861
Companies that filed for Chapter 11 bankruptcy in 1990
Department stores of the United States
Lower East Side
Macy's, Inc.
Midtown Manhattan
1861 establishments in New York (state)